The James Comet was a 98 cubic centimeter (cc), two-stroke, motorcycle manufactured by the James Cycle Co. and announced on 21 October 1948.  A post-World War II design, the Comet went into production in late 1948.

Comet J1 / J3 / J10 rigid frame
Engine: Villiers Engineering 1F engine at 98cc 47mm x 57mm engine. Late 1952 & 1953. the J3 Comet Deluxe models were fitted with the Villiers 4F engine. Carburetor was a Villiers Type 6/0.
Transmission: Two speed with clutch. Handlebar gear lever has 'trigger'.
Frame: Single downtube frame.
Suspension: Front was taper tube for girder type with single, central undamped spring. Rear: None
Brakes: 4" front and rear
Drive: Chain and sprocket

Comet J11
The Comet J11 was manufactured from 1954–1955.
Engine: Villiers Mk 4F (98cc) (47mm x 57mm), Carburetor was a Villiers Type 6/0
Transmission: Two speed with clutch.
Frame: Single down tube
Suspension: Front was lightweight telescopic fork, plastic gaiters. Rear was a plunger-type.
Brakes: 4" front, 5" rear
Drive: Chain and sprocket

Comet L1
The Comet L1 was manufactured from 1956–1964.
Engine: Villiers Mk 4F. Capacity 98cc, (47mm x 57mm). Villiers Mk 6F optional
Transmission: Two speed with clutch.
Frame: Tubular front and top rails.  Pressed & fabricated central tub and swinging-arm.
Suspension: Front was lightweight telescopic fork, plastic gaiters. Rear swingarm.
Brakes: 4" front, 5" rear
Drive: Chain and sprocket

See also
List of James motorcycles
List of motorcycles of the 1940s
List of motorcycles of the 1950s

References
James Motorcycles Information Website
James Motorcycle Website - resources and manuals

Comet
Motorcycles introduced in the 1940s